Nicholas Eveleigh ( – April 16, 1791) was an American planter and political leader who was a delegate to the Continental Congress for South Carolina in 1781 and 1782.

Early life
Eveleigh was born in Charleston, Province of South Carolina about 1748. He and his parents moved to Bristol, England around 1755. He remained there until 1774, although he conducted some business related to family property from London. Then he returned to South Carolina where he made his home for the rest of his life.

Career
In the Revolutionary War, Eveleigh first joined the 2nd South Carolina Regiment as a captain on June 17, 1775. After he participated in the defense of Fort Moultrie on June 28, 1776, he was promoted to colonel. He later served as the deputy Adjutant General for the Continental Army for South Carolina and Georgia. He resigned on August 24, 1778.

Eveleigh was elected to the South Carolina House of Representatives in 1781. Later that year, they sent him as one of their delegates to the Continental Congress. In 1782, he returned home and served as a member of the State's Council (later called the state senate) in 1783. He left public service for a time, and worked to improve his plantation.

On September 11, 1789 Eveleigh became the first Comptroller of the United States Treasury, under President George Washington.

Personal life
Eveleigh and his wife, Mary, had no children. She survived him and later remarried, to become the second wife of widower Edward Rutledge.

Death
Eveleigh died in office in Philadelphia, Pennsylvania on April 16, 1791. Washington appointed Oliver Wolcott, Jr. to replace him.

References

External links

Eveleigh’s Biographic note on U.S. Congress webpage

1740s births
Year of birth uncertain
1791 deaths
Politicians from Charleston, South Carolina
Continental Army officers from South Carolina
Continental Congressmen from South Carolina
Members of the South Carolina House of Representatives
South Carolina state senators
18th-century American politicians
Comptrollers of the United States Treasury
American planters